The Malmaison Hotel Liverpool, England is an eleven-storey building located alongside Prince's Dock in the city centre. Part of the luxury hotel chain Malmaison, the Liverpool hotel is the chain's first purpose built location.

The hotel has three large suites - 'Love Suite Love', 'The Kop' and 'The Toffee Shop' - the latter two are themed around the city's two Premier League football teams; Liverpool and Everton respectively. The hotel contains 130 rooms, a brasserie, bar and gym.

External links

 Malmaison

Buildings and structures in Liverpool
Hotels in Liverpool
Hotel buildings completed in 2006
Hotels established in 2006